Euboarhexius is a genus of ant-loving beetles in the family Staphylinidae. There are at least four described species in Euboarhexius.

Species
These four species belong to the genus Euboarhexius:
 Euboarhexius dybasi Carlton & Allen, 1986
 Euboarhexius perscitus (Fletcher, 1932)
 Euboarhexius sinus Grigarick & Schuster, 1966
 Euboarhexius trogasteroides (Brendel, 1892)

References

Further reading

 
 

Pselaphinae
Articles created by Qbugbot